Wide Angle Youth Media is located in Baltimore, Maryland.  Wide Angle Youth Media is a 501(c)3 non-profit organization that provides Baltimore youth with media education to tell their own stories and become engaged with their communities. Through quality after-school programming, in-school opportunities, summer workshops, community events, and a Traveling Photography Exhibit, Wide Angle supports young people making a difference through media.

See also
 Media in Baltimore

References

External links 
 

Non-profit organizations based in Maryland
Citizen mass media in the United States
Mass media in Baltimore